Bin Phere Hum Tere is a 1979 Bollywood drama film directed by Rajat Rakshit. The film stars Asha Parekh and Vinod Mehra.

Plot
Jamuna lives a poor lifestyle in Gangapur with her widowed step-mother. She is of marriageable age, but instead of getting her married, she is sold to her maternal uncle, Mukand Bihari, who, in turn, sells her to a brothel madame, Telanbai, where Jamuna is confined and forced to dance and sing against her will. She does manage to escape one day, and comes to the rescue of two runaway twins, Raju and Debu, and takes them to Bandra, Bombay, to their cancer-ridden father, Jagdish Sharma. Jagdish and Jamuna are attracted to each other, and both believe to be each other's spouses, even though no formal marriage is performed. Jamuna continues to look after the twins even after Jagdish passes away, and endures many difficulties raising them. Years later, the twins have grown up, while Raju is employed in a factory, Debu is a doctor. Raju has fallen in love with his boss' daughter, Shikha, while Debu is in love with Kiran. Jamuna meets both girls and approves of them. Then her past comes to pay her a nasty visit when she comes face to face with one of her patrons, Jagmohan, none other than Shikha's dad, on one hand, and Telanbai - who is Kiran's mother. Struggling to hold her own against these odds, Jamuna must now also come to terms with other life-changing decisions - including death and subsequent deception - decisions that she may end regretting for the rest of her life.

Cast
Asha Parekh as Jamuna Sharma 
Vinod Mehra as Raju Sharma / Debu Sharma (Dual Role)
Sarika as Shikha 
Nazneen as Kiran 
Kamal Kapoor as Jagmohan 
Jankidas as Jagmohan's Employee 
Jagdish Raj as Ganesh
C.S. Dubey as Mukand Bihari   
Nadira as Talenbai
Rajendra Kumar as Jagdish Sharma

Music

External links
 

1979 films
Films scored by Usha Khanna
1970s Hindi-language films
1979 drama films
Indian drama films
Hindi-language drama films